This is a list of primary characters from the anime series Tengen Toppa Gurren Lagann. Most of them are people who became the first members of Kamina's Team Gurren. The plot of Tengen Toppa Gurren Lagann is divided into two main story arcs, separated by a seven-year timeskip. After the timeskip, most characters pass through important changes in their appearances and/or personalities, and some of them have their own unique roles in the overall story.

Protagonists

Simon

Personal Gunmen
Lagann
Gurren Lagann
Arc-Gurren Lagann
Super Galaxy Gurren Lagann
Tengen Toppa Gurren Lagann
Tengen Toppa Lagann (movie only)
Super Tengen Toppa Gurren Lagann (movie only)

The series' protagonist,  (pronounced as SEE-mohn) originally started off as a boy in the beginning of the story who suffered from low self-esteem due to his lack of parents (who were both killed in a cave-in) and a fear of earthquakes. Though physically underdeveloped for his age and ignored by adults and snubbed by girls, Simon is a valued digger in Giha Village. Simon is eventually befriended by Kamina, whose inspirational speeches start to give him enough confidence to muster his courage and take action in bouts of intense determination. Finding Lagann during his dig, Simon joins Kamina in going to the surface where he develops a crush on Yoko before learning she has feelings for Kamina. When Kamina died during the formation of Team Dai-Gurren, Simon is thrown into a maddened and pervasive depression, driving him to be overly aggressive in combat while isolating himself among the Team. But Simon's meeting with Nia helps him come to a revelation about his own nature, leading to him discarding his fears and doubts as he takes over Kamina's role as Team Dai-Gurren's leader.

In the second half of the series, Simon has grown into a young man who bears an uncanny resemblance to Kamina, but is able to exercise caution when necessary. Simon planned to marry Nia until Antispiral uses her to begin their attack on Earth. This results with Simon being sent to jail by the government to ease the people, later breaking free with Viral's help to take back Cathedral Terra as he leads Team Dai-Gurren to save Nia and destroy Antispiral. Managing to marry Nia before she fades away, Simon gives Lagann's key to Gimmy as he leaves his friends to wander the planet under a low-profile as a nameless vagrant, stating that, "there are others more fit to travel down the tunnels I dug". In the epilogue, the old man that Simon has become watches his former comrades setting out to contact other races throughout the galaxy to help prevent the Spiral Nemesis and ensure the safety of the universe. It is revealed that the narrator at the beginning of most episodes is old Simon, since the narrator's Japanese and Bang Zoom! English dub voice actors also voice old Simon.

Kamina

Personal Gunmen:
Gurren
Gurren Lagann

 is a young man from Giha, a subterranean village, who dreams of leaving the underground and going to the surface, a place which he alone believes he saw as a child with his father. His father went on, but Kamina was too hesitant to join him. As a result, Kamina swore that he would one day return to the surface and rejoin his father. Possessing a seemingly arrogant personality, Kamina is very passionate about his goals and will pursue them without a trace of fear, hesitation, or sometimes sense. This attitude often manifests itself in dramatic speeches which have the power to rally all those who hear them to his call. As his first act of notoriety, Kamina forms "Team Gurren" and convinces his "blood-brother," Simon, to help him with his plan to drill through the roof of the village and get to the world above. However, the plan fails. Kamina willingly takes the blame for disrupting the peace and is jailed by the village chief. At night, Simon breaks him out to show him an extraordinary artifact he unearthed, only to be interrupted by a large Gunmen that crashes through the village's ceiling. A young girl sharpshooter named Yoko descends from the surface and ends up joining Kamina (now carrying a nodachi that he stole from the village chief) and Simon as they pilot the newly unearthed Gunmen Kamina names "Lagann". Together, they defeat the invading Gunmen and reach the surface in the process.

After the trio breaks through, they meet many enemies and friends as they continue forward. Kamina eventually gets his own Gunmen, which he names "Gurren". During a fight, Kamina discovers a skeleton that turns out to be his own father. After burying him, Kamina takes his father's tattered cloak and a small piece breaks off at the end. Simon grabs this piece and ties it around his arm, signifying their bond. The once two-member "Team Gurren" expands to the size of an entire resistance force aiming to overthrow the Beastman Empire. Kamina leads this force and names it "Team Dai-Gurren". Kamina's largest battle involves the capture of one of the enemy’s moving fortresses belonging to one of the Four Divine Generals, Thymilph. The mission is a success, but not without cost. Heavily wounded, Kamina combines with Simon to form Gurren Lagann and defeats the Beastman General with his signature move: "Giga Drill Breaker." Kamina dies in the cockpit, leaving Simon with this: "Listen up, Simon, and don't forget. Believe in yourself. Not in the me who believes in you. Not in the you who believes in me. You should believe in yourself!" These words are long remembered after his death, giving Simon the confidence to uphold his destiny as the "one whose drill will pierce the heavens." Also, Kamina's signature pose, in which he sticks his index finger up into the air, along with his catchphrase,  is mirrored by several characters during the show as a tribute to him and as a symbol of confidence in Team Dai-Gurren. Kamina is buried in the battlefield where he died, his nodachi stabbed into the ground and his cloak tied to its sheath.

After the fall of the Beastman Empire, a new city is built from the ruins of the former capital, Teppelin, and is named "Kamina City." A huge statue of Kamina stands at the center of the city in his honor. However, the monument is destroyed after the citizens discover the truth about the Human Annihilation System and revolt against the government.

Kamina died in episode 8 and reappeared in episode 26, although in completely different character. Simon, under the influence of the Anti-Spirals, witnesses visions of a false childhood where Kamina eggs Simon on to drill into banks and jewelry shops to steal valuables for him. He is shown groveling at the feet of beastmen on top of a hill, begging for his life and urging Simon to do the same. Simon reaches for his Core Drill and finds it missing. Then the true Kamina appears, wearing his cloak and holding his nodachi, and asks Simon if he lost his Drill. Kamina then reminds Simon that his drill is his soul, that Kamina and his fallen comrades will live on in him, and that he is the one whose drill will pierce the heavens. Simon is reminded of what he is fighting for: for the sake of Nia and for the fate of the Spiral Universe. This breaks the Alternate Multiverse Labyrinth, allowing Simon to reassemble Team Dai-Gurren and face the Anti-Spirals for the final time. In the epilogue, Kamina's grave is seen surrounded by other swords that represent the members of Team Dai-Gurren who gave their lives in the final battle.

Yoko Littner

Personal Gunmen:
Yoko M Tank (movie only)
Space Dayakkaiser (anime only)
Space Yoko W Tank (movie only)
Tengen Toppa Yoko W Tank (movie only)
Super Tengen Toppa Gurren Lagann (movie only)

, the series' lead female character, is a young woman from the village of Littner.  She has considerable combat experience even before her chance meeting with Kamina and Simon. In Episode 1 a gunman crashes through the roof of Giha village and prepares to attack the populace when Yoko, who has been tracking the Gunmen, rappels down a cliff whilst firing her electromagnetic rifle. Her solo attack disables the Gunmen, giving Kamina and the villagers time to seek safety.  Kamina, however, chooses instead to make advances at Yoko and initially diminishes her combat qualifications on the grounds of being a woman, yet acknowledges "that lady's spunk".

She decides to accompany Simon and Kamina on their quest. Despite their constant banter Yoko soon becomes infatuated with Kamina.  She is also the object of Simon's naive crush until he discovers the two kissing. Yoko is stated to be the same age as Simon, but it is heavily implied that her home-town measures time differently, as all humans live underground and might have a differing number of days in a year. She is very mature for her age and is the most rational member of the group. Those traits helped her to cope with Kamina's death although she remained affected by it.

After the war of liberation, in which she plays a major role, Yoko eschews taking part in politics at Kamina City. Desiring to distance herself from her warrior past, she takes the name Yomako and moves to remote Koreha Island. There, she accepts the job of teacher at that island's elementary school. However, after learning of events occurring at Kamina City, and being attacked by two gunmen she temporarily leaves the island and breaks into Rinkane Jail to release Simon. After leaving the prison with Boota, Simon and Viral, she joins other members of Team Dai-Gurren and pilots the Dayakkaiser to pursue the war against the Anti-Spirals.
 
In the epilogue an older Yoko is seen at the same school mentioned earlier, but in the role of principal.

Nia Teppelin

Personal Gunmen:
Tengen Toppa Solvernia (movie only)
Super Tengen Toppa Gurren Lagann (movie only)

 is a mysterious young girl found sleeping in a capsule in the middle of a dump site by Simon when he was still distraught over Kamina's death. Later revealed to be Lordgenome's daughter, she learns the harsh reason why her father left her to die. She had no prior contact with humans except her father, though she is very curious, pure and innocent. Despite early misgivings from her lineage, she is quickly accepted by Team Dai-Gurren, much to the initial irking of Yoko, who later becomes a close friend of hers. During her journey, she develops a strong empathy for Simon and joins him in the final confrontation against her father.

Seven years after the war with the Beastmen, Nia receives a marriage proposal from Simon. She refuses at first, after her bubbly contrived logic causes her to misunderstand his words, but after receiving counseling from Kiyoh and Kiyal, she decides to accept. However, when the population limit is reached, the Anti-Spiral data awakens within her and permanently converts her into an Anti-Spiral virtual lifeform, serving as the Anti Spirals' emissary in charge of Earth's Human Extermination System. But in spite of her emotionless persona and being a step ahead of Team Dai-Gurren, Simon points out to Nia that all her actions and appearances before him were in fact the act of her true feelings of her former self, who urges Simon to keep fighting, allowing Nia to have the strength to return to her former self while ending the Human Extermination. However, she is transported back to the Anti-Spiral homeworld so the data on Team Dai Gurren can be extracted from her for analysis, with Simon vowing to rescue her. Although she is saved, the Anti-Spiral's death makes Nia fade away because her existence as a program is dependent on the Anti-Spiral Race. She lasts long enough to be wed to Simon before vanishing, leaving behind only her ring. In the epilogue, which takes place 20 years later, a memorial site is seen in her honor, located adjacent to Kamina's burial ground.

She has a running gag of rambling on incoherently due to her lack of knowledge of regular customs, with one example being her cell phone away message stating, "I am not here right now, well it is not that I am not here it is just I cannot reach my cellphone right now. Also, please try calling my house than my cell...". Despite Simon describing it as making her nearly impossible to understand, he also notes she always spoke warmly and kindly.

Viral

Personal Gunmen:
Enki
Enkidu
Enkidudu
Tengen Toppa Enkidurga (movie only)
Super Tengen Toppa Gurren Lagann (movie only)

 (pronounced "Veer-ral") is a member of the Human Eradication Army, who regards Kamina as a strong rival since losing his Enki's helmet to the newly created Gurren Lagann. Though being among the more humanoid of the Beastmen, his DNA contains aspects of tiger genetics. He is extremely loyal to Lordgenome and the four supreme generals, and he does his best to serve them. He has a personal Gunmen called Enki while under General Thymilph, which mainly utilizes swords and a powerful head-mounted laser (Named in the manga as the Enki Sun Attack). After Kamina's death, he continues to fight Gurren Lagann to regain his honor, thinking that Kamina is still alive. However, upon learning the truth, a shocked Viral focuses his frustrations on Simon before refusing to kill him on Cytomander's orders when he holds Yoko hostage. Brought before Lordgenome, Viral learns the truth of the Beastmens' lifespans before receiving the gift of immortality. Though he believed it was so he can kill Simon with no fear of death in his new Gunmen Enkidudu, Lordgenome reveals that the immortality was to ensure that he had an eternal witness of the Spiral King's power. But Lordgenome dies in the battle and an astonished Viral disappears as Dekabutsu collapses around him.

Years later, having protected some humans who wished to remain underground, Viral resurfaces and causes an uproar with Enkidudu, calling Simon out to fight him. He is later taken into custody by the Grapeals, placed in the same prison Simon later ends up as a scapegoat for the Anti-Spirals' appearance. Becoming a reformed villain of sorts, Viral pilots Gurren during the battle against the Anti-Spirals and seemingly gains his own Spiral Energy from being exposed to Simon's, seen in his Core Drill in the series and Tengen Toppa Enkidurga in the movie. It is also shown that his deepest desire is to get married and have children, but he cannot do so as Beastmen lack the spiral energy necessary for reproduction. In the epilogue, he becomes the captain of the Super Galaxy Dai-Gurren and an emissary for Earth.

Rossiu Adai

 is a boy from another underground village, Adai, in which the people worship the Gunmen as gods. A modest but intelligent person, he is the apprentice of Father Magin, the High Priest who governs Adai and performs its ritualistic method of dealing with over population by having people draw sticks with the winners sent up to the surface to die, Rossiu's mother being among those chosen. But when Gimmy and Darry were selected to leave the village, Rossiu is horrified to learn Magin rigged it as they are orphans and decides to go with the twins and, thus joining Team Gurren. Before he leaves, the village elder gives him a book that seems to withhold some secrets from humanity's past, with the task to find someone able to read it, as no one in his village can decipher its contents. After joining Team Gurren, he is often teased by Kamina, who calls him "Forehead Boy". After Kamina's death, Rossiu temporarily begins piloting Gurren in his place.

After the end of the war, Rossiu became Simon's second-in-command, always trying to make him act more serious about his duties as the ruler of Kamina City. However, in spite of his time with Team Dai-Gurren, Rossiu became a lot like Magin and took Lordgenome's last words seriously, leading a secret project to access Lordgenome's memories and learn the history behind him and the Anti-Spirals. However, when the Anti-Spiralized Nia causes a riot across the city, with an angry mob formed against Team Dai-Gurren, Rossiu decides to use Simon as a scapegoat and overthrows him. Though he was the one who placed him in prison with the death penalty, keeping up a cold heartless facade in public, Rossiu lamented his actions in secret from all except Kinon. From there, Rossiu and his subordinates prepared a contingency plan by having the rest of the people to take shelter in the underground villages, assumed to be safe by the government, with a select few to board the excavated Arc-Gurren. However, when Leeron showed him that no life form, in the surface or underground, would survive the impact, which would render the planet completely uninhabitable for one year, Rossiu decided to change his plans, by filling the rest with animals and livestock, ensuring a chance of survival of them, and abandoning the rest of mankind. Earth was then attacked earlier than expected, and he had to escape with only half the expected refugees on board of the Arc-Gurren.

However, Rossiu's plans were once again foiled by the Anti-Spirals who had already set a large force awaiting to ambush the Arc-Gurren in space. Just when he was about to lose hope, Simon and the rest of Team Dai-Gurren came to his aid. One week after the Human Extermination System was stopped, Rossiu left a farewell message and set for Adai where he intended to commit suicide after settling things with Magin, revealing that he was never able to decipher the book; the best theory he has is that someone had filled the book with gibberish as a prank and the two share a laugh. However, Kinon found the message and Simon rushed with her in Gurren Lagann to stop him, with Simon beating some sense into him and giving Rossiu the strength to keep living just like Kamina had done for Simon. Rossiu takes the duty of watching out for Kamina City, while Simon and the rest of Team Dai-Gurren depart from Earth to the Anti-Spirals' homeworld, having Kinon and Guinble assist him. After the final battle against the Anti-Spirals, Rossiu was the priest for Simon and Nia's wedding, and in the epilogue, he is seen still holding the position of commander-in-chief, as Simon did not reclaim it and wonders if he did a good enough job as a leader or if Simon would have done better.

Kittan Bachika

Personal Gunmen:
King Kittan
King Kittan Deluxe
Space King Kittan

 is the oldest of the Black Siblings. During his first encounter with Team Gurren, he mistakenly confuses Kamina for a Beastman. This is reconciled, when it is discovered that Kamina is piloting the Gunmen, Gurren. Shortly after, the two teams (the Black Siblings and Team Gurren) come into contact with the sixteen-headed enemy Gunmen, whom the Black Siblings had crossed paths with earlier. After the eventual defeat of the enemy Gunmen, the two teams part ways. (In the manga, they meet up with Kamina and co at the same time Viral makes his entrance.) Kittan eventually parted ways with his sisters, who join up the Team Gurren soon after, before returning to aid Team Gurren against Thymilph in his own acquired Gunman, King Kittan, and with others inspired by Kamina who obtained Gunmen of their own they have captured and customized. This event consequently leads to the formation of Team Dai-Gurren. As a result of the death of Kamina, Kittan temporarily takes over as the leader (though self-proclaimed) of the team, but after Simon recovers from his depression over Kamina's death, Kittan transfers the control of leadership to him.

After the war, Kittan became the Chief of the Legal Affairs Bureau in Kamina City, but starts to resent Rossiu when he sentences Simon to death and then allow his sister Kinon to wear an explosive-equipped vest to accompany Simon in the case he attempts to escape. Though he eventually understands the position Rossiu was in, Kittan resigns after discovering about Rossiu's plan to evacuate Earth using the Arc-Gurren, along a small fraction of the human population, and abandoning the rest to die, when the moon falls. Before leaving, he demanded Rossiu to return the Core Drill he took from Simon and rushed on his Gunman to deliver it back to him.

In episode 25, Kittan meets his demise by protecting the other members of Team Dai-Gurren. Super Galaxy Dai-Gurren, unable to escape the incredibly dense space sea produced by the Death Spiral Machine, is ordered by Simon to move towards the center of the sea, where the Machine rests surrounded by a powerful shield. After the ship's weapons fail to get anywhere near the shield, Kittan offers to take the Space King Kittan on a mission to destroy the shield and fire spiral-based missiles at the core of the Death Spiral Machine, but not before stealing a kiss from Yoko, and apologizing for "[his] selfishness". Though he successfully breaks through the shield, the Space King Kittan is crushed by the immense gravity of the space sea, leaving Team Dai-Gurren shocked at what they think is the death of Kittan. However, the original King Kittan, wielding one of the drills that broke off from the Gurren-Lagann when it was attempting to transform Super Galaxy Dai-Gurren into humanoid form, flies towards the Machine's core, screaming his final speech. Kittan awakens his own Spiral Energy, melding the drill to his King Kittan, and performing his own variation of the Giga Drill Breaker (King Kittan Giga Drill Break) to destroy the Death Spiral Machine. The resulting explosion engulfs and kills Kittan, who acknowledges his interest in Spiral energy before his demise, but also frees the Super Galaxy Dai-Gurren from the space sea, allowing Simon to transform it into Super Galaxy Gurren-Lagann and fulfill Kittan's dying wish.

In the epilogue, a memorial site, in the form of a sword, is seen in his honor right alongside Kamina, Nia, and the other members of Team Dai-Gurren who gave their lives in the war with the Anti-Spirals. In the movie, there is a brief scene after the final battle where Kittan's siblings mourn their brother's death, with his memorial marker still placed alongside Kamina.

Boota

The unofficial mascot of Team Dai-Gurren,  is a small pig-mole from Giha village, whom Simon keeps as a pet. Boota is characterized by his sunglasses and star pattern surrounding his tail. No matter how many years pass, Boota's physical appearance does not change much. Although he can only say "BOOTTA!" (hence the name), he can understand humans, and even has near-human intelligence. His favorite spots to stay are between Yoko's breasts or on Simon's shoulder. He has ripped off his tail and consequently the tip of his rear end as an emergency food supply for Kamina and Simon so as to provide energy to the starving duo during a crucial fight, and also has served as a morale figure to Yoko, when she first hesitated at piloting Gurren in place of Kamina. He too was thrown in prison along with Simon, and even had his own pair of miniature handcuffs. When Simon and Viral broke out of jail, Boota loyally ran to Simon's shoulder. However, upon seeing Yoko again, he hastily jumped in her cleavage once more.

Boota proved his true value to Team Dai-Gurren in episode 25, when he asked Viral for entry into Gurren's cockpit and from there, released a massive surge of Spiral Energy to aid a worn-out Simon in his task to power up Super Galaxy Dai-Gurren. Lordgenome stated that this occurred not only because humans aren't the only beings capable of generating Spiral Energy, but it also may be a reaction from Boota, being frequently exposed to Simon's Spiral Energy. In episode 26, Boota stands to protect Lordgenome from the Anti-Spiral trying to attack him, and when their Spiral Energy resonates, he is transformed into an anthropomorphic humanoid. His attacks are laced with Spiral Energy. Curiously, his "human form" appears in the prologue of the first episode. The glasses Boota has in his humanoid form look similar to the glasses Nono wears in her Buster Machine No. 7 form in the anime Diebuster.  Unfortunately, this transformation allows the Anti-Spiral to trap Boota in the Multiverse Labyrinth; when he was freed by Simon, the transformation was undone.

In the epilogue, he is seen wandering the world alongside an aged Simon.

Leeron Littner

, nicknamed "Ron", is the village mechanic of Littner, who is able to repair and scavenge the various Gunmen he and his group encounter. Quite knowledgeable, rather flamboyant, and homosexual, Leeron was the first one to join Kamina, Simon, and Yoko on their quest to defeat the Beastmen. He has become the main technician for Team Dai-Gurren, as well as being in charge of coordination and communication between the Gunmen during battle from Dai-Gurren. His ability to learn and adapt is incredibly great, seeing as he once mentioned that he didn't even know how to read before becoming a mechanic.

In part 1, upon first meeting Kamina and Simon, Leeron acts extremely flirtatious around the two newcomers, using a rather graphic array of phrases when around them. Kamina reacts to Leeron with threats, drawing his nodachi and cursing him. Simon for the most part doesn't mind, but still regarded him with concern. Later in the series, Leeron pulls off of his attempts to proposition the boys, resulting in a more cordial relationship, and many times Simon praises Leeron for his work.

At several points in part 3, Leeron makes flirtatious advances of a kind on both Gimmy and Viral, resulting in both of them leaping out of his immediate vicinity. This happens 3 times in the case of Gimmy and once with Viral. Viral reacted the same way Kamina did, drawing his cleaver and cursing him. It is speculated that it was "breaking" Viral in, that he had become the character that had once been his biggest rival, Kamina.

After the war, Leeron became the Chief of the Science Bureau of Kamina City, and his team even succeeded in launching a rocket to the moon in order to investigate it and confirm the veracity of Lordgenome's ominous prophecy.

Throughout the series, Leeron never seemed to age (except for a brief appearance in the epilogue, where his normally green hair appears to be somewhat greyer).

Antagonists

Beastmen Kingdom
Beastmen are a "species" of humanoids that act as the primary antagonists for Parts I and II of the anime series Tengen Toppa Gurren-Lagann. They are the product of an ideal blending of human and animal genes, intentionally flawed hybrids with a human intelligence and form but great diversity in size, shape, and limbs. Their animal features can be almost anything: marine, amphibian, mammal, bird, or sometimes an entirely unrecognizable type of animal. Lordgenome originally engineered the Beastmen as soldiers against the Anti-Spirals, because the substitution of animal genes distorted the shape of human spiral DNA and rendered them invisible to detection. However, doing so came at the cost of evolutionary potential, for Beastmen lack Spiral Energy and thus cannot pilot Gunmen without the use of solar-powered batteries. Furthermore, their bodies deteriorate at an accelerated rate and their cell lines weaken overtime, thus forcing Lordgenome to deep freeze unborn specimens who are in a constant state of regeneration.

Following the extinction of the Spiral Warriors at the hands of the Anti-Spirals, Lordgenome retreated to Earth and recommissioned his Beastmen to act as population control. Piloting towering Gunmen, the Beastmen patrolled the planet's surface and used their superior technology to kill any human who trespassed above ground, preventing the human population from ever growing large enough to be detected by the Anti-Spirals. Lordgenome divided his forces into the four branches of the "Human Eradication Army", each led by one of his four Supreme Generals, responsible for monitoring a distinct cardinal direction of the planet's surface. Each of the four "Supreme Generals" is a representation of one of the four classical elements: earth, air, fire and water.

After Lordgenome's death, the Beastmen armies were disbanded and all Gunmen were scrapped. Many Beastmen living within Teppelin itself survived its collapse, and were persuaded by Nia Teppelin to accept peace with the human victors and were integrated into Kamina City's society without prejudice. On the outskirts of civilization, liberated Beastmen warlords continued to wage campaigns against human settlements, so battles between the New Government and Beastmen erupted over time. Seven years following the Battle of Teppelin, few if any of these resistance forces remained, most having been eliminated by Grapearl Squadrons.

Thymilph

 is the first of the Spiral King's Four Supreme Generals introduced in the story, representing the classical element of fire. He is Viral's initial superior officer and the commander of the Human Eradication Army Eastern Branch, which he monitors from the deck of the land battleship, the Dai-Gunzan. He is good friends with Adiane, though Guame insinuates a closer relationship. He is a skilled tactician and proud warrior, and was ultimately killed when Kamina and Simon destroyed his personal Gunmen, the Byakou, with the Giga Drill Breaker.

Thymilph appears as a stout but large, well-built imposing armored warrior with gorilla features. He also resembles Triple Seven from Dead Leaves. He is impressively strong, almost always seen as in the company of a large iron hammer he presumably uses in close-quarter combat. A seasoned and confident war veteran, Thymilph has a high respect for caution and shrewdness, but like Viral, possesses a warrior's code of honor. Guame implies that Thymilph was idolized by many Beastmen throughout the Beastmen Empire.

Thymilph's name is based on the DNA chemical thymine and the elemental Sylph. His Gunmen, Byakou, is based on the mythical White Tiger, Byakko.

Adiane

 is the second of the Spiral King's Four Supreme Generals, and the only female general among their number. She is a representation of the classical element of water. She is good friends with her fellow General, Thymilph, though Guame jokes that they had a closer relationship. She implies this friendship was strong because both Guame and General Cytomander treat her as an inferior because of her gender, while Thymilph respected her as a warrior. After Thymilph's death, Adiane is stunned and vows revenge, volunteering to attack the Team Dai-Gurren when given the opportunity by Lordgenome. Though she refused his aid as she blamed him for Thymilph's death, Adiane recruits Viral after he saved her from being crushed by the Dai-Gurren after an attempt to execute Nia once she learns Lordgenome abandoned her. But because of her boasting and staking of her pride on the task, Adiane refuses to return to Teppelin until she destroys Team Dai-Gurren, using the sea to her advantage when the Dai-Gurren crosses it on its way to Teppelin.

Having Viral pilot her Dai-Gunkai to drag the Dai-Gurren into the cold depths, Adiane engages in personal combat with the Gurren-Lagann in her Sayrune to ensure no interference. But the plan fails and Adiane attempts to take Nia hostage until Yoko disables the Sayrune's shoulder, leaving it opened to close-range fire from the Dai-Gurren's artillery cannons and killing Adiane instantly in the explosion.

Adiane looks almost completely human, though she has a long, thick scorpion tail and a snake eye. She wears an eyepatch over her left eye and dresses in a loose fitting dress and heels. She is intensely hot and impulsive, often letting her anger get the better of her and land her in sticky situations or taking out her frustrations on Viral. Despite this impetuous disposition, she is extremely skilled, and is able to battle five powerful Gunmen at once outside of her natural element of water.

Adiane's name is based on the DNA chemical adenine and the elemental Undine. Her Gunmen, Sayrune, is based on the mythical Azure Dragon, Seiryū.

Cytomander

 is one of the Spiral King's Four Supreme Generals and the commander of Teppelin's aerial forces and owner of the flying battleship, Dai-Gunten. Cytomander is the embodiment of the classical element of air or wind. After Adiane's death, Cytomander personally goes after Team Dai-Gurren in Dai-Gunten, but is forced to retreat after Gurren Lagann hijacks one of his fighters to give itself wings and causes his battleship to suffer massive damage. A month after that, on the 6th day of Team Dai-Gurren's assault on Teppelin, a maddened Cytomander leads a two-pronged attack with Guame in the Dai-Gundo, only to lose his life when his Gunman, Shuzack, is rammed by the Dai-Gurren as it sinks the Dai-Gunten.

Cytomander's name is based on the DNA chemical cytosine and the elemental Salamander. His Gunmen, Shuzack, is based on the mythical Vermilion Bird, Suzaku.

Guame

 is one of the Spiral King's Four Supreme Generals, who specialises in ground combat. Guame is the representation of the classical element of earth. His appearance is like that of a crocodile and armadillo and the oldest of the four generals, revealed in the parallel works to be originally an animal-like figure seen by Lordgenome's side as a parallel to Boota, living as long as or almost as long as the Spiral King has. In episode nine, he, along with the two other generals, reported the death of Thymilph to the Spiral King. He gives off the impression of one with a perverted mind and showed why when he made snide comments about the relationship between Thymilph and Adiane. Guame appears to merely respect the Spiral King, unlike the other Beastmen, who worship him as a god. When questioned by Cytomander after he boldly asked the king to let him go after Team Dai-Gurren, Guame explains his relation to King of being ages old (he later referred to Cytomander as a "pup of two-hundred-years age", implying that he is significantly older than Cytomander, enough for 200 years to seem like nothing). Succeeding in capturing the Dai-Gurren's crew, Guame had Nia brought to him and reveals to her the truth he thought on why she was abandoned while attempting to offer to spare her life if she accepts to be leader of the "Beauty Village" where the Spiral King gets his consorts from. But Nia refused and Guame was forced to retreat when Team Dai-Gurren escaped and fought back.

A month after that, on the 6th day of Team Dai-Gurren's assault on Tepplin, Guame joins Cytomander in a two-pronged attack with both their battleships. After the Dai-Gunten is sunk, Guame uses Teppelin's power supply to have the Dai-Gundo create a massive tornado, in order to destroy Team Dai-Gurren and their reinforcements, but his plans are ruined when the Gurren-Lagann tunnels underneath the fortress to impale it with its drill, running Guame through in the process as the Dai-Gundo explodes.

It is revealed in the Parallel Works 8 video that Guame was once Lordgenome's animal companion, fulfilling a role similar to Boota.

Guame's name is based on the DNA chemical guanine and the elemental Gnome. His Gunmen, Gember, is based on the mythical Black Tortoise, Genbu.

Lordgenome

Personal Gunmen:

Lazengann
Dekabutsu
Unnamed Daigun, later named Arc-Gurren by Rossiu (flashbacks; Parallel Works 8)
Cathedral Terra (flashbacks; Parallel Works 8)

 is the main antagonist of the first story arc. He is known as the "Spiral King", a cruel and ruthless tyrant who has employed the Beastmen to systemically eradicate all humankind on the planet's surface for over a thousand years. He commands his armies from Teppelin, a gigantic funnel-shaped fortress which is actually a massive gunman in hibernation. He is typically a very somber character, but can throw himself into a frenzy during a battle, displaying superhuman feats of strength, agility, and endurance, to the point where he can easily hold his own against Lagann. In the past, Lordgenome was a child with an affinity toward animals, until he found a gunman similar to Lagann and battled the Anti-Spirals when they invaded his world. He became one of the four distinguished Spiral Generals, who commanded legions of Spiral Warriors charged with ensuring peace and order throughout the Milky Way Galaxy. The battle eventually became hopeless as their numbers dwindled, and the Anti-Spirals finally appeared directly to Lordgenome, spiritually and mentally breaking him by killing everyone on board the Cathedral Terra before using Lazengann to transform Cathedral Terra into Cathedral Lazengann and wipe out his entire fleet. Soon after, the Cathedral Terra was converted by the Anti-Spirals into a defense mechanism, and Lordgenome used his Beastmen in an effort to drive the population underground and keep them to a bare minimum. He also created "Beauty Village," a village made up of girls abducted from other villages, in order to stop the birth of an Anti-Spiral scout. He had a number of children with the women of the village over the centuries, and he killed all of them after they became self-aware.

However, Lordgenome's plans go awry when Team Dai-Gurren is formed, and he is eventually forced to fight Gurren Lagann in Lazengann to put an end to the human resistance. Lordgenome is fatally injured by Simon as a result, cryptically prophesying the Anti-Spirals' return before he falls off of Teppelin. Seven years later Lordgenome's brain is recovered by Rossiu, and regenerated into a head that serves as a "bio-computer" to provide the group access to all of his knowledge. He eventually regains his self-awareness and his personality from before being driven mad, and helps in the fight against the Anti-Spirals, even completely regenerating and sacrificing himself during the final battle so Team Dai-Gurren can win.

Lordgenome's name is based on Lord, a feudal superior, and Genome, an organism's hereditary DNA.

Antispiral

 is the true main antagonist of Tengen Toppa Gurren-Lagann, and the main antagonist of the second story arc. In order to combat it, they found the means to halt their own evolution by purging themselves of Spiral Power, trapping themselves in a state of suspended animation as their collective consciousness took form to purge the universe of all Spiral Life.

He first appears as a disembodied voice in episode twenty four, but is formally introduced in episode twenty six. His physical form is a chaos of arbitrary human concepts fluctuating on a black silhouette, with cartoonish gestures and exaggerated expressions. His near-infinite spiral energy gives the Anti-Spiral extensive, almost supernatural powers, which manifest in the form of purple energy. With these abilities, he is able to manipulate or even break physical and chemical laws (going as far as altering probability), which he does regularly both offensively and as a form of intimidation. Antispiral has the mannerisms of a scientist, suggesting he had a hand in both the creation of Anti-Spiral technology and the decision to undergo the millennia-long battle against the universe's spiral beings. Antispiral is very proud and holds deep contempt for Spiral beings, frustrated that in spite of his efforts, there are Spiral beings who still resist the limiting of their populations and continue to defy the resolution of his race and their ideology. Antispiral is depicted as being omniscient and omnipresent on a multiversal level, having complete control over every dimension Team Dai-Gurren encounters, having knowledge of everything they are doing, and at one point trapping their consciousness in a Multiverse Labyrinth of "infinite possibilities".

Thousands of years before the events in Tengen Toppa Gurren-Lagann take place, Antispiral defeated Lordgenome's army of Spiral warriors, and overwhelmed Lordgenome's mind by explaining the nature of Spiral Nemesis to him, causing him to accept Antispiral's conditions for allowing the continuation of the human race.  These were the instillation of an Anti-Spiral factor within humanity's genetic code that would activate once Earth reached Spiral Energy Level 2, with the total human population at one million, converting its one host into an Anti-Spiral "virtual program" that would carry out the mission to end all life on Earth in order to prevent Spiral Nemesis. When this failsafe eventually occurs, Nia becomes Antispiral's messenger, executing the "Human Extermination System", which is soon revealed to be the moon itself, spiraling out of its orbit to collide with the planet and kill all life upon it. Simon stops the collision by activating the moon, revealing the gigantic battleship Cathedral Terra, and Nia, having recovered part of her former self, states that the battle is far from over: mankind's survival of the Extermination has fated it to face the true might of Antispiral. Team Dai-Gurren gain possession of the Cathedral Terra and rename it to the Super Galaxy Dai-Gurren, and use its systems to pinpoint Nia's whereabouts via Simon's deep connection with her in order to battle Antispiral at the source. However, before their arrival, Antispiral sets a decoy signal between the 10th and 11th dimensions to lure them into the Galactic Spiral Abyss, which they barely escape thanks to the sacrifice of Kittan. But once overcoming Antispiral's second trap, Team Dai-Gurren rescues Nia and defeats Antispiral, being killed by Simon. In the series, Simon achieves this with help from Nia in Lagann while in the movie, Simon fights Antispiral before using his own blood to create a drill to land the killing blow. Antispiral refuses to accept that his race was wrong to restrict Spiral Power, but with his last breath, he asks Simon if Earth will now assume the responsibility of protecting the universe.

Secondary characters

Team Gurren/Team Dai-Gurren
Team Gurren was first created by Kamina in Giha Village. However, at that time, it was made up of a few boys from the village, as well as Simon and Kamina, who tried various attempts at getting to the surface. After a failed attempt to reach the surface, the other three boys blamed Kamina for the incident to avoid punishment, which resulted in Kamina disowning them from Team Gurren. Simon and Kamina (accompanied by Yoko) later reached the surface, and traveled to Littner Village. There, Kamina stole a Gunmen from a Beastmen, and left to find the Gunmen base, along with Yoko and Leeron as the newest members of Team Gurren. Along the way, Team Gurren met the Black Siblings, but they refused to join.

Later on, Rossiu, Gimmy and Darry from Adai Village joined Team Gurren, and it made its way to a local hot springs resort. There, the Team Gurren met the female members of the Black Siblings once again. The resort turned out to be a Beastmen-run Gunmen, and so the Black Siblings and Team Gurren worked together to defeat them, acquiring the mysterious Old Coco as a new member during the chaos.

After the incident, Viral and the Dai-Gunzan met Team Gurren and Gurren Lagann fought the fortress Gunmen. Simon and Kamina were almost defeated by the Dai-Gunzan, but were rescued by Dayakka in his personalized Gunmen. The rest of Team Gurren were rescued from a group of Gunmen by Kittan, the eldest Black Siblings, who also had a custom Gunmen. Simon was able to trick the Dai-Gunzan and collapse it into the bottom of a gorge, and returned to find that people had heard of Kamina stealing a Gunmen, copied him, and assembled to join Team Gurren, now renamed Team Dai-Gurren due to their abundance of new members. They later managed to steal the Dai-Gunzan, at the price of Kamina's death, and it became the new base of operations for the team. Led by Simon, they decided to go to Teppelin and defeat the Spiral King.

From that point on, many others have joined Team Dai-Gurren, including Nia, and a large force of humans, who saw Simon's success in defeating Divine General Guame, joined their offensive against Teppelin.

The symbol of Team Dai-Gurren is a flaming red skull with Kamina's signature red sunglasses. However, after the timeskip, most members wear a simple 5-pointed star, as they have become key members of the Earth's new government. High-ranked members wear two stars in their chest, and Simon, being the commander-in-chief, wears three. Rossiu also wears a large one on his back in the epilogue shaped similar to Simon's glasses; it could be an indicator of rank (he's president) or possibly the government's official logo.

Dayakka Littner

Personal Gunmen:
Dayakkaiser
Tengen Toppa Dai-Gurren (movie only)

 is the former leader of Littner Village, abandoning his post, when most of Littner joined Team Dai-Gurren. His Gunmen is the Dayakkaiser, but after the seizure of Dai-Gunzan, he acted as the captain of Dai-Gurren during battles, while Kiyoh piloted the Dayakkaiser in his stead. After the timeskip, we discover that Dayakka is appointed the Minister of Food Affairs for Kamina City, and he and Kiyoh have married and expecting a child. With the threat of the Anti-Spirals, Dayakka resigns his post and returns to his duties in Team Dai-Gurren.

Gimmy Adai

Personal Gunmen:
Grapearl (Blue)
Space Grapearl (Blue)
Tengen Toppa Grapearl (movie only)
Gurren Lagann (epilogue)

 is a boy from Adai Village, who used to be cared for by Rossiu. His name seems to be similar to the Japanese word for 'right' (右 migi). When three new children were born into the village, the population exceeded its limit of 50, which mandated that two people be removed and sent to the surface. Since Gimmy and Darry had no parents, the village elder chose them to leave the village, however, Rossiu decided to go with them. The pair of twins have a very good bond with each other, and were often left to their own devices around Dai-Gurren, except when they were with older girls, such as Yoko or Nia. After the timeskip, Gimmy and Darry become important Grapearl pilots, often fighting together. Gimmy tends to be more impulsive and reckless, which sometimes puts the duo in trouble.  Throughout the series, he's shown to fear Leeron, running in terror in the first portion, and later to continue to distance himself at the first sign of Leeron's "flirtation".

After Nia vanished, Simon hands down Lagann's Core Drill to Gimmy and in the epilogue, he is seen alongside Darry, not only as commanders of the Grapearl squad, but as the new pilots of Gurren Lagann.

Darry Adai

Personal Gunmen:
Grapearl (Pink)
Space Grapearl (Pink)
Tengen Toppa Grapearl (movie only)
Gurren Lagann (epilogue)

 is a girl from Adai Village, who used to be cared for by Rossiu. She is Gimmy's twin sister and has a good bond with him. Her name seems to be similar to the Japanese word for 'left' (左 hidari).  As a young girl, she was shy and quiet and used to cling to a plush doll, which she carried with her at all times. After the timeskip, however, she is much more confident and has left her old personality behind. As a Grapearl pilot, she is careful, calm and perceptive, and puts more thought and planning into her actions than Gimmy.

In the epilogue, she is seen alongside Gimmy, not only as commanders of the Grapearl squad, but as the new pilots of Gurren Lagann.

Kiyoh Bachika

Personal Gunmen:
Dayakkaiser (anime only)

 (born ) is the oldest of Kittan’s younger sisters. In episode six, when fighting her way out of an enemy Gunmen, she is shown to possess good combat ability. She was helping out in Dai-Gurren's control room until episode 13, when she starts aiding in the frontlines, piloting Dayakka's Dayakkaiser Gunmen, which she begins to use when Dayakka begins to command aboard Dai-Gurren.

In the Parallel Work "Kittan Zero" she is shown wielding two yoyo like weapons.

After the timeskip, we discover that Kiyoh and Dayakka have married, and Kiyoh gives birth to a daughter, whom she names Anne. Anne happens to be the newborn that makes the human population reach one million, and as soon as she is born, the Human Extermination System begins.

In the manga she, Kittan, and her other sisters appear earlier in the story (during Team Gurren's time in Littner Village) and explains to Simon that their home village, Bachika, was destroyed by Viral.

Kinon Bachika

 is the second oldest of Kittan’s younger sisters. After Team Dai-Gurren’s capture of Dai-Gunzan, she takes up a position within its control tower, monitoring the radar. She seems to be the calmest and smartest member of the Black Siblings.

After the time-skip, she becomes one of Rossiu's main supporters. After Simon offered himself to protect the city using Gurren Lagann, even after being sentenced to death, Kinon volunteered to pilot Gurren and rig herself with bombs inside its cockpit, claiming that she would detonate them, killing her and Simon in the process, in case of him making an attempt to escape. Later, it is revealed that Kinon's resolve to follow Rossiu, despite betraying Simon and ordering his execution, was not only the fruit of her feelings for him, but because she was also witnessing how difficult it was for Rossiu to do it, and the fact that he didn't do it for personal gains, but because the circumstances forced him to it.

After stopping Rossiu from committing suicide with Simon's help, she stays on Earth to aid him on the administration of Kamina City, while Simon and rest of Team Dai-Gurren head off to face the Anti-Spirals.

Kiyal Bachika

Personal Gunmen:
Kiyalunga

 is the youngest of the Black Siblings. Just like Kiyoh, she was helping out in Dai-Gurren's control room until episode 13, when she starts aiding in the frontlines piloting a customized Gunmen, Kiyalunga (named after herself), which can transform into a shield and lance that are wielded by Kittan's Gunmen, King Kittan.

After the time skip, she lives with Dayakka and Kiyoh.

Old Coco

 is a mysterious, silent old man who leads Team Gurren to the hot springs resort in episode six. Although he tricks the group into entering the Beastmen's trap, he helps Kamina later on by letting him onto the Beastmen Gunmen. He then gets caught up with Team Dai-Gurren, and now follows it around, although nobody seems to notice him. He seems to be incredibly hard to notice, to the point of saving Nia in episode eleven, and disappearing again before anyone realises he is gone. The timeskip reveals that he is in fact a Beastmen who was in charge of taking care of Nia, and continued to do so after she was no longer the princess of Teppelin.

Old Coco's voice is only heard once in the last episode, when he greets Nia after she returns home, and gives her the wedding dress he made.

Zorthy Kanai

Personal Gunmen:
Sozoshin
Space Sozoshin
Tengen Toppa Sozoshin (movie only)

 appears at the end of episode seven as a new addition to Team Dai-Gurren. His most recognisable quality is his smoking habit, which is unique to every other character in the series. The name of his Gunmen is the Sozoshin. Zorthy is killed during the first deep space battle versus the Anti-Spirals. However, in the movie version, his death is avoided.

In the epilogue, a memorial site, in the form of a sword, is seen in his honor right alongside Kamina and the other members of Team Dai-Gurren.

Iraak Coega

Personal Gunmen:
Ainzer
Space Ainzer
Tengen Toppa Ainzer (movie only)

 is a member of Team Dai-Gurren. He pilots a Gunmen that serves Yoko as a mobile rifle platform. Together, they assaulted Dai-Gunzan with the rest of the Team Gurren. The name of his Gunmen is Ainzer. Iraak is killed during the first deep space battle versus the Anti-Spirals, after he and Kidd attempted to avenge Zorthy. In the Manga, he and Kidd are a duo calling themselves "The Whirlwind brothers". In Gurren Gakuhen he was one of Kittan's Gang.

In the epilogue, a memorial site, in the form of a sword, is seen in his honor right alongside Kamina and the other members of Team Dai-Gurren. However, in the movie version, his death is avoided.

Kidd Coega

Personal Gunmen:
Kidd Knuckle
Space Kidd Knuckle
Tengen Toppa Kidd Knuckle (movie only)

 is another new member of Team Dai-Gurren. His Gunmen utilizes two pistols to attack enemies, the Kid Knuckle. Kid is killed during the first deep space battle versus the Anti-Spirals, when he and Iraak attempt to avenge Zorthy's death. However, in the movie version, his death is avoided.

Kid's post-timeskip design bears a striking resemblance to Lupin III.

In the epilogue, a memorial site, in the form of a sword, is seen in his honor right alongside Kamina and the other members of Team Dai-Gurren. In the Manga, he and his brother Ailaac form the "Whirlwind Brothers", also called "Tornadoe Brothers" by Kamina. He is one of the Bancho in Kittans gang in Gurren Gakuhen.

Jorgun and Balinbow Bakusa
Balinbow 
Jorgun 

Personal Gunmen:
Twin Boukun
Space Twin Boukun
Tengen Toppa Twin Boukun (movie only)

The two are always hyped and normally speak in manly grunts and monosyllabic phrases. They sport differently coloured sunglasses, which can be used to tell one brother from the other—Jorgun wears red shades, while Balinbow sports blue ones. After the timeskip, the two were appointed Directors of the Public Affairs Department, in which they were responsible for the human population count. Jorgun and Balinbow are killed in the first deep space battle versus the Anti-Spirals, after saving Gimmy and Darry's lives. However, in the movie version, both of them survived while the above event of their deaths did not happen.

In the epilogue, a memorial site, in the form of a sword, is seen in their honor right alongside Kamina and the other members of Team Dai-Gurren.

Makken Jokin

Personal Gunmen:
Moshogun
Space Moshogun
Tengen Toppa Moshogun (movie only)

 is a fairly silent man who is an important part of Team Dai-Gurren, but has rarely spoken or gotten much screen time whatsoever. He has his own Gunmen, Moshogun, which is based on an ancient samurai.

After the timeskip, Makken is married to Leite with three children. Sadly, he is killed in the first deep space battle versus the Anti-Spirals, after sacrificing himself to stop a large Anti-Spiral missile from destroying the Super Galaxy Dai-Gurren.

In the epilogue, a memorial site, in the form of a sword, is seen in his honor right alongside Kamina and the other members of Team Dai-Gurren. However, in the movie version, his death is avoided.

Attenborough Cortitch

 is a hyperactive, impulsive, trigger-happy man, who is the gunner of Dai-Gurren's control team. He tends to fire at enemies or move Dai-Gurren without warning.  This is humorously employed by Attenborogh hammering the fire buttons repeatedly, screaming at the top of his lungs ("FIRE!" or "FIRE EVERYTHING!" normally). After the timeskip, he joins Leeron's science team and still appears to have his hyperactive nature. After Team Dai-Gurren moved to Super Galaxy Dai-Gurren, he assumed the same position he had before at the weapons control. Curiously, this trait became one of Tengen Toppa Gurren-Lagann's attacks. It was discovered that he joined Team Dai-Gurren by having "snuck into some bozo's luggage".

Tetsukan Littner

 is a member of the control team for Dai-Gurren. He is in charge of monitoring the condition of the ship. After the timeskip, he becomes a part of Leeron's science team. Also due to being attracted to the fast-food restaurants that were built in the new city he became obese. In the "alternate universe" scenes in Episode 26, Tetsukan is seen sleeping in a bed with Cybela, implying that the two are involved in a relationship, or that one (or both) of them desire to be. In the epilogue, he is seen working under Viral's command alongside Cybela.

Gabal Docker

 is Team Dai-Gurren's helmsman, in charge of Dai-Gurren's steering and maneuvering.

Leite Jokin

 is the chief engineer of Team Dai-Gurren and Leeron's direct subordinate. She is a skilled and ingenious mechanic, an ideal work partner for the naturally gifted Leeron. Her central duties revolve around maintaining Dai-Gurren's spiral engine, which appears less technologically sophisticated in Fortress-class Gunmen thus requiring additional fuel beyond spiral energy. Her personal trademarks are her lab coat and a cigarette she holds in her mouth.

In Part III, Leite's role in the story is expanded from a virtual background character to an important member of the supporting cast. She is married to Makken, who she affectionately calls "Oto-chan" or "Daddy", and the two have three children. Leite and Makken operate a small business servicing mechanical equipment and automotive vehicles, though on occasion they get contracts to develop weapons from the New Government. She and Makken have great faith in Simon and his capacity as a decision maker; their loyalty to him urges them to resist Rossiu by rebuilding the scrapped Gunmen of Team Dai-Gurren, refitting them with spiral weaponry capable of damaging Mugann. Leite also refits Gurren Lagann's power pack to allow it to reach escape velocity, but opts out of the Battle of Earth to stay with her children on the surface. When Team Dai-Gurren is reformed, she assumes her old post as engineer of the gang's flagship, the Super Galaxy Dai-Gurren. She eventually ends up as one of the fourteen pilots of Tengen Toppa Gurren-Lagann, battling Grand Zamboa to both avenge Makken's death at the hands of Anti-Spiral Kantai and for the freedom of the entire galaxy.

In Anti-Spiral's parallel world illusion, her desired job appears to be an elementary school teacher, together with Lordgenome as principal.

Government
Most of Team Dai-Gurren have become part of the government, mostly as heads of departments managing the city, or parts of the military. However, there are some new characters not seen before the timeskip, mainly found in Rossiu's Intelligence team.

Guinble Kite

, along with Kinon, seems to be one of the more important members of Rossiu's intelligence team. He and Kinon often accompany Rossiu, and stayed with him on Earth to watch out for the city while the rest of Team Dai-Gurren headed into space for their final battle against the Anti-Spirals.

Cybela Coutaud

 is mainly seen at a computer, where she can communicate with Grapearls or do analysis tasks. Later, she joins Team Dai-Gurren, assuming a position at Super Galaxy Dai-Gurren's bridge. In the epilogue, she is seen still working there, now under Viral's command. Her name is an anagram of "shirabe", which means "to search".

References 

Lists of anime and manga characters

ja:天元突破グレンラガンの登場人物#主要人物